Natalia Hanikoğlu ( Belyaeva, born 23 June 1975 in Moscow, Russia) is a Turkish-Russian volleyball player. She is 190 cm tall and plays as a middle blocker and outside hitter. She plays for Galatasaray Medical Park and wears the number 7 jersey. She played over 100 times for the Russia national team, and when she received Turkish citizenship after marrying Turkish former volleyball player Hakan Hanikoğlu, she played over 200 times for the Turkey national team, too. She has a daughter whose name is Ela (meaning: Hazel) born in Moscow.

She also played for CSKA Moscow, Zarechie Odintsovo in Russia, Ancona in Italy, Kocaelispor, Beşiktaş and Eczacıbaşı in Turkey.

Awards

Club
 2011–12 Turkish Cup –  Runner-up, with Galatasaray Daikin
 2011–12 CEV Cup –  Runner-up, with Galatasaray Daikin

See also
 Turkish women in sports

References

External links
 Player biography
 Natalia Hanikoglu at the International Volleyball Federation
 
 Natalia Hanikoğlu (Natalya Nikolaevna Belyaeva) at Volleybox.net

1975 births
Living people
Turkish women's volleyball players
Russian women's volleyball players
Turkish people of Russian descent
Eczacıbaşı volleyball players
Kocaelispor volleyballers
Beşiktaş volleyballers
Turkish expatriate volleyball players
Turkish expatriate sportspeople in Italy
Turkish expatriate sportspeople in Azerbaijan
Galatasaray S.K. (women's volleyball) players
Sportspeople from Moscow
Mediterranean Games gold medalists for Turkey
Mediterranean Games medalists in volleyball
Competitors at the 2005 Mediterranean Games